Chanakya (c. 370–283 BCE) was an adviser of the first Maurya Emperor Chandragupta. 

Chanakya may also refer to:

 Chanakya (1984 film), a 1984 Indian Kannada film
 Chanakya (2005 film), a 2005 Tamil language film
 Chanakya (2019 film), a 2019 Telugu language film
 Chanakya (TV series), an Indian television historical drama
 Chanakya National Law University, a legal education institution in Bihar

See also
 Chanakyan
 Chanakyapuri, an affluent neighborhood in New Delhi